Rocourt may refer to:

 Rocourt, Jura, municipality of Jura in Switzerland
 Rocourt, Liège, district of the city of Liège, Wallonia in Belgium
Stade Vélodrome de Rocourt, a former multi-use stadium
 Rocourt-Saint-Martin, municipality of Aisne in France
 Rocourt, Vosges, municipality of Vosges in France